The sixth season of the American reality series Bar Rescue premiered on March 11, 2018 and ended on September 29, 2019 on Paramount Network (formerly Spike).

Experts
Jon Taffer – Host/Star/Bar Consultant

Chefs

Vic Vegas
Anthony Lamas
Jason Santos
Tiffany Derry
Michael Ferraro
Ryan Scott
Aaron McCargo Jr.
Kevin Bludso
Frank Pinello

Mixologists
Lisamarie Joyce
Jacob Forth
Rob Floyd
Mia Mastroianni
Shawn Ford
Phil Wills
Charity Johnston
Emily DeLicce
Ashley Clark
Derrick Turner
Brian Van Flandern
Alex Goode
Amy Koffsky
Tommy Palmer

Other experts
Jillian Schmitz – dance expert
Renae Lemmens – adult entertainment expert
Oscar Sidia – clinical professional counselor

Episodes

Notes

References

External links
 
 Bar Rescue Updates — Unaffiliated site that keeps track of bars being open or closed and has updates for each bar

2018 American television seasons
2019 American television seasons
Bar Rescue